Alexander Agustín López Rodríguez (born 5 June 1992) is a Honduran professional footballer who plays as an attacking midfielder for Liga FPD club Alajuelense and the Honduras national team.

Club career

Early career
Born in Tegucigalpa, Distrito Central, Francisco Morazán, López joined Olimpia's youth system at the age of 7. He remained in the youth ranks until 2010, where he was finally able to make the breakthrough into the first team.

Olimpia
On 8 August 2010, López made his league debut against Hispano F.C., coming on for Bani Lozano in the 70th minute. He scored his first goal – which was the second of the match – to help seal a 2–0 victory.

Following the 2012 Summer Olympics, López was continuously linked with a move to Europe, with English side Wigan Athletic being an alleged suitor for the young playmaker. However, these transfer links came to nothing, and López remained at Olimpia for the following season.  In 2022, a British journalist called Kieran Morris claimed that Wigan's interest in the player, which was reported as fact in national newspapers in the UK and Honduras, had been fabricated by him and his friends, who contacted various press outlets pretending to be a club insider or journalist as a prank.

Houston Dynamo
On 6 August 2013, López signed for Major League Soccer side Houston Dynamo as a Designated Player. He made his debut for the club on 20 August in the CONCACAF Champions League against W Connection F.C. in a 0–0 draw. He made his league debut 3 days later in the 5–0 defeat against the Montreal Impact. Despite impressing fans with demonstrations of his individual skill – most notably his 30-yard rabona chip for Jason Johnson on his first start against the New York Red Bulls – López was unable to hold down a place in the Dynamo side for the remainder of the 2013 season, as issues with homesickness and fitness prevented Dominic Kinnear from giving the Honduran an extended run in the side. He finished the season with 2 appearances, and providing 1 assist, playing no part in Dynamo's performance in the 2013 Eastern Conference finals.

Return to Olimpia
On 18 January 2016, López returned to Olimpia and signed a six-month contract after it was confirmed that he would no longer continue with Houston Dynamo. He made his first appearance since his return the following 31 January in a 0–0 draw against Real España, replacing Romell Quioto in the 56th minute. He would help Olimpia win the 2016 Clausura tournament, which was also the club's 30th title win.

Al-Khaleej
López signed a two-year deal with Saudi Professional League side Khaleej FC on 28 June 2016. He made his debut the following 12 August in the 3–1 defeat against Al-Faisaly, scoring his first goal. On 22 January 2017, the club announced through their social networks that they had terminated the contract of López.

Second return to Olimpia
After his contract with Al-Khaleej was terminated, López re-signed with Olimpia. On 9 February 2017 he scored in his return match, a 7–1 win over C.D.S. Vida. López would win the inaugural CONCACAF League tournament with Olimpia in October 2017, after his side defeated Santos de Guápiles 4–1 on penalties in the second leg.

Alajuelense
On 13 January 2018, López signed for Costa Rican side Liga Deportiva Alajuelense. He made his league debut for the club in a 3–1 loss against Pérez Zeledón. López would score his first goal in the return fixture against Pérez Zeledón in a 3–0 win.

International career
On 18 November 2008, López made his debut for the Honduras U-17 during the 2009 CONCACAF U-17 Championship qualification match against Belize. He scored his first goal in the 53rd minute in a 9–0 victory. In 2009, he was included by Emilio Umanzor in the 21-man squad for the 2009 FIFA U-17 World Cup in Nigeria.

López represented his country at the 2012 Summer Olympics in London. He would only play three games, as Honduras would be eliminated by Brazil in the quarter-finals.

In October 2010, López made his senior debut for Honduras in a friendly match against Guatemala. He scored his first senior international goal on 1 September 2017 in the 2018 World Cup qualifying match against Trinidad and Tobago in a 2–1 win. His second goal would come on 21 November 2018 in a 4–1 friendly loss against Chile.

Career statistics

Club

International
Scores and results list Honduras goal tally first, score column indicates score after each López goal.

Honours
Olimpia
 CONCACAF League: 2017

Alajuelense
 Liga FPD: Apertura 2020
 CONCACAF League: 2020

Honduras
 CONCACAF Nations League third place: 2021

Individual
 CONCACAF League Team of the Tournament: 2017
 CONCACAF League Golden Ball: 2020

References

External links 
 

1992 births
Living people
Sportspeople from Tegucigalpa
Association football midfielders
Honduran footballers
Honduran expatriate footballers
Honduras international footballers
Olympic footballers of Honduras
C.D. Olimpia players
Houston Dynamo FC players
Khaleej FC players
L.D. Alajuelense footballers
Liga Nacional de Fútbol Profesional de Honduras players
Major League Soccer players
Designated Players (MLS)
Saudi Professional League players
Expatriate soccer players in the United States
Expatriate footballers in Saudi Arabia
Expatriate footballers in Costa Rica
Honduran expatriate sportspeople in the United States
Honduran expatriate sportspeople in Costa Rica
2011 Copa Centroamericana players
Footballers at the 2012 Summer Olympics
2013 CONCACAF Gold Cup players
2017 Copa Centroamericana players
2017 CONCACAF Gold Cup players
Copa Centroamericana-winning players
2019 CONCACAF Gold Cup players
2021 CONCACAF Gold Cup players